Rania Hussein Mohammed Tawfik (born October 8, 1981), known as Ruby (sometimes transliterated as Roubi), is an Egyptian singer, actress and occasional model who rose to fame with her debut single "Enta Aref Leih" ("Do You Know Why?") in 2003.

Biography

Musical career
The first music video of her debut single "Enta Aref Leih" (2003), was directed by Sherif Sabri and was a hit on most satellite music stations in the Middle East during the summer of 2003. Ruby was criticized by the media for appearing in the provocative costume of a belly dancer in the song's music video. Despite this criticism, the successful single brought Ruby into the limelight.

Ruby's second video was released in early 2004. The video was titled "Leih Beydary Kedah" (Why Is He Hiding His Feelings Like This?) and directed by Sherif Sabri; the video again also featured provocative scenes. Her third music video "El Gharaam (Koll Amma A'ollo Ah)" was accompanied by clips from Ruby's movie, "Saba' Wara'aat Kotcheena" (7 Playing Cards). The film was banned by the governments of some Arabic countries due to its usage of erotic themes. 

Ruby was questioned in numerous interviews about her provocative style and suggestive moves, to which she responded that she does not consider herself to be a sex symbol. She was also rumoured to be married to her manager, Sherif Sabri, but they have both denied the rumour.

In 2008, she released a single Yal Ramoush (Wonderful Eyelashes). She is also the one who sang the theme song of Al Wa3d Movie Awwel Marra.

Acting career

Ruby's debut in Egyptian cinema was in 2000 in the Egyptian film Film Saqafi (Cultural Film). In 2019, she participated in two Egyptian films including Hamlet Pheroun and The Treasure 2. Ruby's last artistic work is The Treasure 2 (Al Kanz 2).
Her father’s family from assuit government 
Ruby had a prominent role in the viral 2020 advertisement for Edita's Molto croissants.

Discography 
 Eba'a Abelni (2004)
 Meshit Wara Ehsasy (مشيت ورا إحساسى 2007)
 Ebka Kabelny (2009)

Singles
 Enta Aref Leih (2003)
 Yal Romoush (2008)
 Hetta Tanya (2021)
 Ana Law Zalana (2021)
 Alby Plastic (2021)
 Hetta Tanya (Harout Zadikian Remix) (2021)
 Namet Nenna'' (2022)

Filmography

References

External links
  Sexy stars push limits in Egypt

1981 births
Living people
21st-century Egyptian women singers
21st-century Egyptian actresses
Egyptian film actresses
Egyptian television actresses
Actresses from Cairo
Singers from Cairo